The BNXT Supercup is the super cup competition of the BNXT League, the top basketball in the Netherlands and Belgium. The super cup match is played by the Dutch champions and the Belgian champions of the previous season. The first Supercup was held on September 11, 2021. Filou Oostende won the inaugural title.

Games

Statistics

Top scorers

References

See also 
 BNXT League

Supercup
Supercup
Basketball supercup competitions in Europe